Ren Luyu (born 9 May 1978) is a Chinese television host.

Early life 
Ren was born in Xinxiang, Henan, China. Ren's first name, "Luyu" is a portmanteau of the abbreviations for Shandong and Henan provinces, the origin of his parents. Ren graduated from Henan University.

Career 
Ren worked for Henan Television. In 2002, he was hired into the Western department of China Central Television (CCTV). He hosted the show Want a Challenge?, then took on a series of roles in the music channel of CCTV.

Ren was a host on the CCTV New Year's Gala on two occasions, in 2010 and 2016.

External links
央视任鲁豫

References

People from Xinxiang
1978 births
Hosts of the CCTV New Year's Gala
Living people